The 2000 United States presidential election in California took place on November 7, 2000, as part of the wider 2000 United States presidential election. Voters chose 54 representatives, or electors to the Electoral College, who voted for president and vice president.

California was won by the Democratic ticket of Vice President Al Gore of Tennessee and Senator Joe Lieberman of Connecticut by 11.8% points over the Republican ticket of Texas Governor George W. Bush and former U.S. Secretary of Defense Dick Cheney of Wyoming.

The state hosted the 2000 Democratic National Convention in Los Angeles and was slightly contested by both candidates due to a large Hispanic population and a large independent and moderate base surrounding San Diego and Sacramento's suburbs. This was the first time since 1880 in which a winning Republican presidential candidate lost California, and the first time ever that a losing Democrat won a majority of the vote in the state. As of the 2020 presidential election, Bush is the last Republican candidate to carry Alpine and Mono county in a presidential election. This was also the first time since 1976 that California did not back the candidate who won the overall presidential election as well.

Bush became the first Republican to win the White House without carrying Santa Barbara County since Abraham Lincoln in 1860. He also became the first nominee of either party to win the White House without receiving at least a million votes from Los Angeles County since this county first gave any nominee a million votes, in 1952. This feat would be reprised by Donald Trump in 2016.

California was 1 of 10 states to back George H. W. Bush in his 1988 landslide that never backed George W. Bush in either of his runs for office.

Primaries
 2000 California Democratic presidential primary
 2000 California Republican presidential primary

Results

By county

Counties that flipped from Democratic to Republican
Merced (Largest city: Merced)
San Bernardino (Largest city: San Bernardino)
San Joaquin (Largest city: Stockton)
Stanislaus (Largest city: Modesto)
Ventura (Largest city: Ventura)

By congressional district
Gore won 33 of 52 congressional districts, including four held by Republicans while Bush won two held by Democrats.

Analysis
Vice President Al Gore easily defeated Texas Governor George W. Bush in California. Bush campaigned several times in California, but it didn't seem to help as Gore defeated Bush by 11.8%. Bush did make substantial headway in the Gold Country, Shasta Cascade, and parts of the Central Valley, flipping San Joaquin, Stanislaus, and Merced Counties (all of which had voted for Bill Clinton twice) and winning the highest vote share of any presidential nominee in decades (exceeding California natives Richard Nixon and Ronald Reagan) in Shasta, Madera, Tehama, Siskiyou, Lassen, Plumas, Modoc, and Sierra Counties. He also flipped San Bernardino County, his largest county flip in the state (and nationally), as well as Ventura County; but he underperformed in all the large, then-historically Republican counties of Southern California and the Central Coast (San Diego, Orange, Riverside, San Bernardino, Ventura, Santa Barbara, and San Luis Obispo) relative to Bob Dole's performance in 1996, losing Santa Barbara outright despite that Dole had lost it by only 4.5%. In the then-Republican bastion of Orange County, Al Gore became the first Democrat to crack 40% since Lyndon Johnson's 1964 landslide.

Furthermore, Gore overwhelmingly won Los Angeles County, the most populous county in the state and the country, and swept the Bay Area (where Bush's father had won Napa County in 1988, the last time a Republican had won the state). In San Francisco, although Bush did improve slightly on Dole's vote share, he posted the second-worst showing of any major-party nominee (after Dole) since John Davis in 1924. Even though Green Party nominee Ralph Nader broke into double digits in the North Coast counties of Mendocino and Humboldt, as well as in Santa Cruz County, these factors helped Gore win statewide by a little over 1.3 million votes, greater than his national popular vote margin over Bush (although less than the raw vote margin whereby he won New York).

Apart from Ralph Nader, Pat Buchanan, the paleoconservative former adviser to Presidents Nixon and Reagan and two-time Republican presidential candidate, was on the ballot as the nominee of the Reform Party, which had been founded by Ross Perot in 1994. However, as in most of the rest of the country, Buchanan fell well short of Perot's 1996 performance in California, cracking 1% only in Glenn County (and in tiny Alpine County, where he received eight votes). Buchanan was essentially a non-factor, and California was projected for Gore upon poll-closing, at 11 PM EST.

Electors

Technically the voters of California cast their ballots for electors: representatives to the Electoral College. California is allocated 54 electors because it has 52 congressional districts and 2 senators. All candidates who appear on the ballot or qualify to receive write-in votes must submit a list of 54 electors, who pledge to vote for their candidate and his or her running mate. Whoever wins the majority of votes in the state is awarded all 54 electoral votes. Their chosen electors then vote for president and vice president. Although electors are pledged to their candidate and running mate, they are not obligated to vote for them. An elector who votes for someone other than his or her candidate is known as a faithless elector.

The electors of each state and the District of Columbia met on December 18, 2000, to cast their votes for president and vice president. The Electoral College itself never meets as one body. Instead the electors from each state and the District of Columbia met in their respective capitols.

The following were the members of the Electoral College from the state. All were pledged to and voted for Al Gore and Joe Lieberman:
Sunil Aghi
Amy Arambula
Rachel Binah
R. Stephen Bollinger
Roberts Braden
Laura Karolina Capps
Anni Chung
Joseph A. Cislowski
Sheldon Cohn
Thor Emblem
Elsa Favila
John Freidenrich
Cecelia Fuentes
Glen Fuller
James Garrison
Sally Goehring
Florence Gold
Jill S. Hardy
Therese Horsting
Georgie Huff
Robert Eugene Hurd
Harriet A. Ingram
Robert Jordan
John Koza
John Laird
N. Mark Lam
Manuel M. Lopez
Henry Lozano
David Mann
Beverly Martin
R. Keith McDonald
Carol D. Norberg
Ron Oberndorfer
Gerard Orozco
Trudy Owens
Gregory S. Pettis
Flo Rene Pickett
Theodore H. Plant
Art Pulaski
Eloise Reyes
Alex Arthur Reza
C. Craig Roberts
Jason Rodríguez
Luis D. Rojas
Howard L. Schock
Lane Sherman
David A. Torres
Larry Trullinger
Angelo K. Tsakopoulos
Richard Valle
Karen Waters
Don Wilcox
William K. Wong
Rosalind Wyman

References

See also

California
2000
2000 California elections